Transfiguration Church in Szentendre is a Serbian Orthodox church in Hungary. Local church parish is under the jurisdiction of Eparchy of Buda. The church was constructed from 1741 until 1746. In 1980 the church appeared on a Hungarian postal stamp. The church is also the home for a museum of Eparchy of Buda. The museum collection includes artwork from the 14th to the 19th centuries. It is only open for the Feast of the Transfiguration around August.

See also
Serbs in Hungary

References

External links
http://www.templom.hu/phpwcms/index.php?id=14,61,0,0,1,0

Szentendre
Serb communities in Hungary
Buildings and structures in Pest County
Tourist attractions in Pest County
Churches completed in 1746
Serbian Orthodox church buildings in Hungary
18th-century churches in Hungary
18th-century Serbian Orthodox church buildings